Ryukyupercis is a monotypic genus of percomorph fish from the family Pinguipedidae, the sandperches.  The only species in the genus,  Ryukyupercis gushikeni, the rosy grubfish, is found in the Indo-Pacific from Japan to north western Australia. The generic name is a compound of Ryukyu after the Ryukyu Islands where the type specimen was collected and "percis" a suffix for many of the genera in the Pinguipediae, the specific name honours Mr Soko Gushiken, a who gave the describer of the species, Tetsuo Yoshino, many specimens.

References

Monotypic fish genera
Taxa named by Hisashi Imamura
Taxa named by Tetsuo Yoshino
Ryukyupercis gushikeni
Pinguipedidae